AIDS and Behavior is a peer-reviewed medical journal covering behavioral aspects of HIV/AIDS research. It was established in 1997 and is published nine times per year by Springer Science+Business Media. The editor-in-chief is Seth Kalichman (University of Connecticut).

Abstracting and indexing
The journal is abstracted and indexed in:
 CINAHL
 Social Sciences Citation Index
 PubMed/MEDLINE 
 Scopus
 PsycINFO
 Embase
 Current Contents/Social & Behavioral Sciences
According to the Journal Citation Reports, the journal has a 2020 impact factor of 3.895.

References

External links
 

HIV/AIDS journals
Publications established in 1997
Springer Science+Business Media academic journals
English-language journals
9 times per year journals